Royal Oak is a small suburb in New Zealand's largest city of Auckland. It is situated between the suburbs of Epsom (north) and Onehunga (south).

Royal Oak is under the local governance of the Auckland Council.

History

It is named after the Royal Oak hotel that was located on the Royal Oak Roundabout. In 1909 the hotel lost its licence to sell alcohol. For many years it was a pharmacy before being used as the premises of Barfoot & Thompson Real Estate Agency. Royal Oak refers to the tree Charles II hid up during the Battle of Worcester to avoid capture.

In the middle of the Royal Oak Roundabout was once located the Seddon Memorial.  Designed by John Park, a local architect who was also mayor of Onehunga on two occasions, the structure was erected in memory of Prime Minister Seddon who died suddenly in office in 1906. Richard John Seddon (1845–1906) was immensely popular and there are several monuments to him around the country. The Royal Oak Monument was in the form of a Gothic Market Cross and was a combined tram shelter, gas lamp standard and drinking fountain.

By the middle of the 20th century it was decided that the memorial was an obstruction to traffic and it was removed during September and October 1947. The Royal Oak roundabout served six converging roads but one has been closed off in recent years.

Royal Oak became the site of New Zealand's first Kentucky Fried Chicken restaurant in 1971.

Royal Oak Mall was expanded significantly in the 1980s to become a significant source of commerce in the area.

Boyd Zoo
Royal Oak was once home to Boyd Zoo, one of the earliest Zoological Garden in New Zealand. It was opened in 1912 by local businessman (and future mayor of Onehunga) John James Boyd. It held 600 to 2000 specimens including several lions, bears, wolves, flamingos, and other exotic animals. Most of the animals were kept in relatively poor conditions. There was an abattoir on site where local stray animals such as horses and cats were slaughtered to be fed to the captive animals.

There is an often repeated tale of a lion escaping from the zoo and wandering around the streets of Onehunga, however this story is somewhat erroneous and misleading. The first appearance of the story was in a community newspaper in 1966. The most probable origin of the story was a lion cub which had gotten into a paddock of cows with calves around the Christmas of 1917. Rather than a wild lion roaming the streets, the small cub was backed into a corner of the paddock by the herd until it was lassoed and returned to its enclosure.

Although the zoo was popular with visitors, the noise and smell made it very unpopular with the locals. Boyd was engaged in a constant battle with the local council over the running of the zoo. Eventually, after several attempts to sell his animals to the council, the council finally reached an agreement with Boyd: 11 lions, 6 bears, and 2 wolves were sold to the council for £800. The animals were given to the newly established Auckland Zoo at Western Springs in 1922.

The Boyd Zoo site was later built on as a temporary hospital for American Marines in 1942, before being converted into Manukau Intermediate School (now renamed as Royal Oak Intermediate School).

Demographics

Royal Oak had a population of 5,334 at the 2018 New Zealand census, an increase of 417 people (8.5%) since the 2013 census, and an increase of 603 people (12.7%) since the 2006 census. There were 1,881 households, comprising 2,511 males and 2,823 females, giving a sex ratio of 0.89 males per female, with 777 people (14.6%) aged under 15 years, 1,158 (21.7%) aged 15 to 29, 2,415 (45.3%) aged 30 to 64, and 987 (18.5%) aged 65 or older.

Ethnicities were 48.8% European/Pākehā, 5.6% Māori, 8.4% Pacific peoples, 42.6% Asian, and 2.6% other ethnicities. People may identify with more than one ethnicity.

The percentage of people born overseas was 48.4, compared with 27.1% nationally.

Although some people chose not to answer the census's question about religious affiliation, 38.2% had no religion, 41.1% were Christian, 0.2% had Māori religious beliefs, 7.1% were Hindu, 2.9% were Muslim, 2.7% were Buddhist and 2.6% had other religions.

Of those at least 15 years old, 1,770 (38.8%) people had a bachelor's or higher degree, and 516 (11.3%) people had no formal qualifications. 888 people (19.5%) earned over $70,000 compared to 17.2% nationally. The employment status of those at least 15 was that 2,307 (50.6%) people were employed full-time, 585 (12.8%) were part-time, and 162 (3.6%) were unemployed.

Schools

All these schools are coeducational. Rolls are as of 

Other secondary schools in the area are Epsom Girls' Grammar School, Auckland Grammar School, One Tree Hill College, St Peter's College and Onehunga High School,.

References

Further reading

External links
Photographs of Royal Oak held in Auckland Libraries' heritage collections.

Suburbs of Auckland